"July, You're a Woman" is a song written by John Stewart and originally released as a duet with Buffy Ford on their 1968 album Signals Through the Glass.

Pat Boone's cover entered the Bllboard Hot 100 at number 100 for one week in April 1969.

Track listing

Charts

References 

1968 songs
1969 singles
Pat Boone songs
Dot Records singles